Daniel Petrov (born 31 October 1982) is a Bulgarian former professional road cyclist. He competed in the men's individual road race at the 2008 Summer Olympics.

Major results

2002
 2nd Overall Tour of Turkey
2003
 1st  Road race, National Road Championships
 1st Stage 3 Tour of Turkey
2005
 2nd Road race, National Road Championships
2006
 4th Overall Tour of Bulgaria
2007
 5th Overall Tour of Bulgaria
 8th Overall Tour de Luxembourg
2008
 1st Overall Tour of Chalkidiki
1st Stage 1
 4th Plovdiv Cup
 7th Banja Luka–Belgrade I
 8th Grand Prix Bourgas
2010
 7th Banja Luka–Belgrade I
2011
 8th Overall Tour of Romania

References

External links

1982 births
Living people
Bulgarian male cyclists
Olympic cyclists of Bulgaria
Cyclists at the 2008 Summer Olympics
People from Gabrovo